Paul E. Tirone (born February 8, 1951 in Newburyport, Massachusetts) is an American politician who was a member of the Massachusetts House of Representatives from 2001 to 2003. He was defeated in the 2002 Democratic primary by Michael A. Costello.

Tirone was involved in exonerating the remaining yet-unnamed five victims of the Salem witch trials, by helping pass an act on October 31, 2001. His wife is a descendant of Sarah Wildes, one of the condemned witches who was hanged in 1692. He took the opportunity to urge caution on a similar reaction to the then-recent September 11 attacks, stating, "Sometimes when things like this happen we need to take a breath, and look at it. We just can't paint blame with a wide brush."

References

1951 births
Northern Michigan University alumni
Northeastern University alumni
Democratic Party members of the Massachusetts House of Representatives
People from Amesbury, Massachusetts
Living people
Politicians from Newburyport, Massachusetts